Dmitri Vladimirovich Godunok (born 4 January 1976) is a Russian football coach and a former player.

External links
  Player page on the official FC Moscow website
 

1976 births
People from Volzhsky, Volgograd Oblast
Living people
Russian footballers
Association football defenders
FC Energiya Volzhsky players
FC Tekstilshchik Kamyshin players
FC Lada-Tolyatti players
FC Tom Tomsk players
FC Moscow players
Russian Premier League players
FC Spartak Vladikavkaz players
Russian football managers
Sportspeople from Volgograd Oblast